Tom Schuler (born November 28, 1956 in Birmingham, Michigan) is a retired American professional road bicycle racer and founder of Team Sports Inc., a sports management company in cycling, mountain biking, triathlon, and roller blading. Since 2006, he has been directeur sportif (team manager) for Targettraining, a UCI Continental team riding USA Cycling's national racing calendar circuit, and Zoot Sports Triathlon Team. In 2009, he was general manager of Team Type 1, the Timex Multisport Team and the Zoot Ultra Triathlon Team.

Schuler was directeur sportif of Saturn Cycling Team, a professional cycling team from 1991 to 2003, and helped found the Volvo-Cannondale mountain bike team.

Schuler, a graduate from the University of Michigan, represented the United States at the 1976 and 1980 Summer Olympics and was one of the original seven members of the 7-Eleven Cycling Team. He was the 1987 USPRO national road champion and the 1981 US professional criterium champion.

Major achievements 
In 2009 Tom became a co-founder of the Tour of America's Dairyland, a 10-day race in Wisconsin that attracts Pro-Teams and riders from around the world. www.TourofAmericasDairyland.com

He also co-founded the Prairie State Cycling Series, a multi-venue race, sponsored by Intelligentsia Coffee and named the Intelligentsia Cup powered by SRAM.

In October 2007 he was inducted into the U.S. Bicycling Hall of Fame.

Directeur sportif/team manager 

1991–2002
 Volvo-Cannondale Mountain Bike Team
1991–2003
 Saturn Cycling Team
1999–2009
 Timex Multisport Team
2005
 Advantage Benefits Endeavour Cycling Team
2006
 TARGETRAINING
2007
 Colavita Olive Oil-Sutter Home Wine. Men's and Women's Team
2008–2009
 Zoot Ultra Triathlon Team
2008–2009
 Team Type 1

2018 - present
 Detroit Cycling Championship presented by the Detroit Athletic Club
 USA Cycling Pro Road Tour
www.DetroitCycling.com

Cyclist 

1979
 Fitchburg Longsjo Classic
1980
 U.S. Olympic Cycling Team
1986 –  7-Eleven Cycling Team
 Athens Twilight Criterium
1987 –  7-Eleven Cycling Team
  national road champion.

References

External links 
 Team Type 1
 Timex Multisport Team
 Zoot Ultra Triathlon Team
 Team Sports Inc.
 Team Saturn: Hail and farewell
 TARGETRAINING

Living people
1956 births
American male cyclists
American cycling road race champions
Sportspeople from Detroit
University of Michigan alumni